The Way College of Biblical Research Indiana was used by The Way International for its leadership training program and biblical research seminars located in Rome City, Indiana for 20 years.  Purchased in 1976, the  site located on the north side of Rome City previously housed the historic Kneipp Springs health spa which was developed between 1897 and 1910 by Dr. W.G. Geiermann, and operated by the Catholic Order of the Sisters of the Most Precious Blood convent.  The college was not accredited.

The campus housed nearly 6,000 students and staff  between 1977 and 1997, and the campus held accelerated biblical research seminars and classes from 1979 to 1996. The campus operation was moved to Gunnison, Colorado in spring of 1998, and  Sylvan Springs, Inc., a non-profit group, purchased the facility for use as a family centre serving northeast Indiana.

Approximately  of the property was designated a historic district in 2018 and listed on the National Register of Historic Places as the "Kneipp Springs Historic District".

References

The Way International
Buildings and structures in Noble County, Indiana
1977 establishments in Indiana
1997 disestablishments in Indiana
National Register of Historic Places in Noble County, Indiana